The 2006 British Academy Television Awards were held on Sunday 7 May at the Grosvenor House Hotel in London. The ceremony was hosted by television presenter Davina McCall and broadcast on ITV the following day. The nominees for the audience-voted Pioneer Award were announced on Tuesday 14 March; other nominees were revealed on Monday 27 March.

Winners
Best Actor
Winner: Mark Rylance — The Government Inspector (Channel 4)
Nominees: Bernard Hill — A Very Social Secretary (More4); Denis Lawson — Bleak House (BBC One); Rufus Sewell — The Taming of the Shrew (BBC One)
Best Actress
Winner: Anna Maxwell Martin — Bleak House (BBC One)
Nominees: Gillian Anderson — Bleak House (BBC One); Lucy Cohu — The Queen's Sister (Channel 4); Anne-Marie Duff — Shameless (Channel 4)
Best Comedy (Programme or Series)
Winner: Help (BBC / BBC Two)
Nominees: The Catherine Tate Show (Tiger Aspect Productions / BBC Two); Creature Comforts (Aardman Animations / ITV); Little Britain (BBC / BBC One / BBC Three)
Best Comedy Performance
Winner: Chris Langham — The Thick of It (BBC Four);
Nominees: Peter Capaldi — The Thick of It (BBC Four); Ashley Jensen — Extras (BBC Two); Catherine Tate — The Catherine Tate Show (BBC Two)
Best Drama Serial
Winner: Bleak House (BBC / Deep Indigo Productions / WGBH / BBC One)
Nominees: Fingersmith (Sally Head Productions / BBC One); Funland (BBC / BBC Three); To the Ends of the Earth (BBC / Power Productions / Tightrope Pictures / BBC Two)
Best Drama Series
Winner: Doctor Who (BBC Wales / BBC One)
Nominees: Bodies (Hat Trick Productions / BBC Three); Shameless (Company Pictures / Channel 4); Spooks (Kudos Film & Television / BBC One)
Best Single Drama
Winner: The Government Inspector (Mentorn Television / Stonehenge Films / arte France Cinéma / Channel 4)
Nominees: Much Ado About Nothing (BBC Northern Ireland / BBC One); The Queen's Sister (Touchpaper Television / Channel 4); Red Dust (BBC / Distant Horizon / Videovision Entertainment / Industrial Development Corporation of South Africa / BBC Films / BBC Two)
Best Continuing Drama
Winner: EastEnders (BBC / BBC One)
Nominees: Casualty (BBC / BBC One); Coronation Street (Granada Television / ITV); Holby City (BBC / BBC One)
Best Current Affairs
Winner: Dispatches - Beslan (??? / Channel 4)
Nominees: Panorama Special - Undercover Nurse (BBC / BBC One); Dispatches - Iraq: The Reckoning (??? / Channel 4); Storyville - A Company of Soldiers (??? / BBC Four)
Best Entertainment Performance
Winner: Jonathan Ross — Friday Night with Jonathan Ross (BBC One)
Nominees: Jeremy Clarkson — Top Gear (BBC Two); Jack Dee — Jack Dee Live at the Apollo (BBC One); Noel Edmonds — Deal or No Deal (Channel 4)
Best Factual Series or Strand
Winner: Jamie's School Dinners (Fresh One Productions / Channel 4)
Nominees: 49 Up (Granada Television / ITV); Cocaine (??? / Channel 4); Coast (BBC Birmingham / BBC Two)
Best Feature
Winner: The Apprentice (Talkback Thames / BBC Two)
Nominees: Dragons' Den (BBC / BBC Two); Ramsay's Kitchen Nightmares (??? / Channel 4); Top Gear (BBC / BBC Two)
Flaherty Award for Single Documentary
Winner: Make Me Normal (Century Films / Channel 4)
Nominees: Children of Beslan (??? / BBC Two); The Real Sex Traffic (??? / Channel 4); Taxidermy: Stuff the World (Century Films / BBC Two)
Huw Wheldon Award for Specialist Factual
Winner: Holocaust, a Memorial Film From Auschwitz (BBC / BBC Two)
Nominees: The Boy with the Incredible Brain (Focus Productions / Five); Life in the Undergrowth (BBC Natural History Unit / BBC One); No Direction Home (Spitfire Pictures / BBC Two)
Lew Grade Entertainment Programme or Series
Winner: The X Factor (Talkback Thames / SYCOtv / ITV)
Nominees: Friday Night with Jonathan Ross (Open Mike Productions / BBC One); Have I Got News For You (Hat Trick Productions / BBC One); Strictly Come Dancing (BBC / BBC One)
News Coverage
Winner: BBC Ten O'Clock News - 7 July 2005, London Bombs (BBC / BBC One)
Nominees: Channel 4 News - The Attorney General Story (ITN / Channel 4); ITV Evening News - The Shooting of Jean Charles de Menezes (ITN / ITV); Sky News - 7 July bombings (Sky News)
Situation Comedy Award
Winner: The Thick of It (BBC / BBC Four)
Nominees: Extras (BBC / HBO / BBC Two); Peep Show (Objective Productions / Channel 4); The Worst Week of My Life (Hat Trick Productions / BBC One)
Sport
Winner: The Ashes - England v Australia (Sunset + Vine / Channel 4)
Nominees: Champions League Final Live: AC Milan v Liverpool (Granada Sport / ITV); Formula One - United States Grand Prix (North One Television / Granada Sport / ITV); The Open Championship - Final Round of Jack Nicklaus (BBC / BBC Two)
Interactivity
Winner: Coast (BBC/BBC Two)
Nominees: Channel 4 News - Breaking the News (Illumina Digital / ITN / Channel 4 / More 4); Not Forgotten / Lost Generation (Wall To Wall / Darlow Smithson Productions / Channel 4); Shakespeare's Stories (BBC Interactive Drama and Entertainment / BBC One)
The Pioneer Award
Winner: Doctor Who (BBC One)
Nominees: The Apprentice (BBC Two); Bleak House (BBC One); The Catherine Tate Show (BBC Two); Desperate Housewives (Channel 4); Jamie's School Dinners (Channel 4); Strictly Come Dancing (BBC One); The X-Factor (ITV)
The Dennis Potter Award
Russell T Davies
The Alan Clarke Award
Adam Curtis
The Richard Dimbleby Award
Jamie Oliver
Fellowship
Ken Loach

References
Winners report from bbc.co.uk.
List of BAFTA Television Award nominees from the official BAFTA website (retrieved 28 March 2006).
List of BAFTA Television Craft Award nominees from the official BAFTA website (retrieved 12 April 2006)
List of nominees from BBC News Online (retrieved 27 March 2006).

External links
 http://www.channel4.com/breakingthenews Breaking the News - Interactivity category
 http://www.channel4.com/lostgeneration Lost Generation - Interactivity category

2006 awards in the United Kingdom
Television2006
2006 television awards
2006 in British television
May 2006 events in the United Kingdom